The 1986–87 Ronchetti Cup was the 16th edition of FIBA's second-tier competition for European women's basketball clubs. It was contested by 32 clubs from 14 countries, seven more than in the previous edition, and ran from 1 October 1986 to 11 March 1987. The final was played in France, in the Alsacian town of Wittenheim, and confronted 18-times European champion Daugava Riga and Italian vice-champion Deborah Milano. The former won 87–80, thus becoming the fifth Soviet club to win the competition. Iskra Ljubljana and VŠ Prague also reached the semifinals.

First qualifying round

Second qualifying round

Group stage

Group A

Grup B

Grup C

Grup D

Semifinals

Final

References

1986-87
1986–87 in European women's basketball